Alexander Hamilton (before 1688 – after 1733) was a Scottish sea captain, privateer and merchant.

Biography
In his early years he travelled widely through Europe, the Barbary coast, the West Indies, India and Southeast Asia. On his arrival in Bombay in 1688 he was briefly pressed into the employ of the Honourable East India Company in a local war, and then set up as a private country trader, operating from Surat. He was appointed commander of the Bombay Marine in June 1717, in which post he suppressed piracy. In 1718, he visited Ayutthaya, Siam (present-day Thailand), his account of his visit to Ayutthaya survives.

The main extant source of information on Captain Hamilton is his own book, A New Account of the East Indies (1727). The term 'East Indies' then covered a much wider geographic area than it does today - 'most of the countries and islands of commerce and navigation, between the Cape of Good Hope and the island of Japan.' Illustrated with lively anecdotes, it provides a valuable insight into British involvement in and perception of early modern Asia.  Confusingly, he used the English name Canton to refer to both the walled city (Guangzhou) and the province (Guangdong), but used Canton more often for the city and Quantung occasionally for the province.

Notes

British East India Company Marine personnel
Scottish sailors
Scottish businesspeople
Privateers
Year of birth unknown
Year of death unknown
17th-century births
18th-century deaths